Taro Daniel was the defending champion but chose not to defend his title.

Rinky Hijikata won the title after defeating James Duckworth 6–3, 6–3 in the final.

Seeds

Draw

Finals

Top half

Bottom half

References

External links
Main draw
Qualifying draw

Burnie International - 1